The CS/LR17/CS/LR18 Modular Automatic Rifle is a "new generation" family of modular rifles developed by NORINCO with marketing to be done by Jianshe Industry Group.

History
The system was first publicly shown in November 2016 with the 5.56×45mm and 7.62×51mm versions (NAR-556 and 751) first shown.  The CS/LR17 series is meant to be marketed to the export market. Their main competitors consist of the AK-12, Galil ACE, HK416/417 and FN SCAR series.

A heavily redesigned variant was shown at the 2018 Zhuhai Airshow.

Design
Development of the CS/LR17/LR18 system first started back in 2014, basing their design on the FN SCAR series. An unnamed UBGL is in development to complement it.

The system consists of three calibers: 5.56×45mm, 7.62×39mm and 7.62×51mm.

Variants 

 NAR-556
 NAR-556/S 5.56×45mm  battle rifle
 NAR-556/CQC 5.56×45mm  assault rifle
 NAR-556/HB 5.56×45mm  sharpshooter rifle
 NAR-556/LMG 5.56×45mm  squad machine gun
 NAR-739 
 NAR-739/S 7.62 X 39mm battle rifle
 NAR-739/CQC 7.62 X 39mm assault rifle
 NAR-739/LMG 7.62 X 39mm squad machine gun
 NAR-751
 NAR-751/S 7.62×51mm battle rifle
 NAR-751/CQC 7.62×51mm assault rifle
 NAR-751/HB 7.62×51mm sharpshooter rifle 
 NAR-751/LMG 7.62×51mm squad machine gun

References

External links
 Official Site  from China Jing An Import & Export Corp.

Assault rifles of the People's Republic of China
Modular firearms
5.56 mm assault rifles
7.62×39mm firearms
Weapons and ammunition introduced in 2016
7.62×51mm NATO battle rifles
Norinco